The Purple Onion was a celebrated cellar club in the North Beach area of San Francisco, California, located at 140 Columbus Avenue (between Jackson and Pacific). With an intimate, 80-person setting, the club was a popular influence in local music and entertainment during the Beat era of the 1950s and '60s.

History
The Purple Onion originally opened in 1952 under the management of Keith Rockwell. His sister and brother-in-law, Virginia "Ginnie" and Irving "Bud" Steinhoff would frequently work weekends at the club until 1960 when they took over management. Bud Steinhoff managed the Purple Onion until his death in November 1983. Virginia Steinhoff continued to operate the club until 1989.

First-wave comedy and performance
Notable entertainers who either got their starts or played the California club in the 1950s and 1960s include Bob Newhart, Lenny Bruce, Woody Allen, Alameda housewife Phyllis Diller (making her stand-up debut in 1955), Richard Pryor, Maya Angelou, The Kingston Trio, Jim Nabors, The Irish Rovers, and the Smothers Brothers—who recorded their first album, The Smothers Brothers at the Purple Onion, there.

Music venue
Tom Guido became the club's manager in 1993. Under him it became the center of San Francisco's garage rock scene, featuring such bands as The Rip Offs, Spoiled Brats, The Trashwomen, The Makers, Tee and Thee Crumpets, The Phantom Surfers, The 5.6.7.8's, Brian Jonestown Massacre, The Groovie Ghoulies, The Go-Nuts, Guitar Wolf and many others. The club closed in 1999. Tom Guido died in 2019.

Return to comedy
In 2004, the club reopened and returned to comedy. Photographer and booker Dan Dion started a weekly comedy night that featured comedians such as Robin Williams, Paul Krassner, Jim Short, and Tom Rhodes. David Owen presented the debut of Mort Sahl in June 2005, and shows by Greg Proops, Zach Galifianakis, Margaret Cho, Todd Barry, Dan Piraro, and Judah Friedlander. By 2010, the club was only running weekend shows, though these shows were usually over capacity at 100–110 people.

Closure and reopening
In September 2012, the building was sold with "no plans to rescue".

The club reopened in August 2014 as Doc's Lab and hosted both music and comedy throughout the week, until its closure in February 2018.

The Purple Onion name has been in use since November 2, 2012, around the corner as The Purple Onion at Kell's at 530 Jackson Street. It continues to showcase underground and Bay Area comedy acts on Wednesday and Thursday nights.

The club reopened in November 2022 as Lyon & Swan, "a high-end restaurant with nightly live entertainment."

References

Music venues in San Francisco
Comedy clubs in California
North Beach, San Francisco
Nightclubs in San Francisco
1952 establishments in California